Finley Glacier is a tributary glacier which drains the northwest slopes of Mount Monteagle and flows north into the upper part of Icebreaker Glacier, in the Mountaineer Range, Victoria Land, Antarctica. It was mapped by the United States Geological Survey from surveys and U.S. Navy air photos, 1960–64, and was named by the Advisory Committee on Antarctic Names for Russell H. Finley, an aviation boatswain's mate with Squadron VX-6 during U.S. Navy Operation Deep Freeze, 1966, 1967 and 1968.

See also
 List of glaciers in the Antarctic
 Glaciology

References 

Glaciers of Borchgrevink Coast